The University Teaching Hospital of Yaounde (French: Centre Hospitalier et Universitaire de Yaoundé - CHU) is one of the main hospitals in Yaoundé, Cameroon. It was founded by a Presidential decree on 28 October 1965.  It has the goal of training general physicians who can diagnose and treat a wide range of diseases, and can provide health education.

References

Yaoundé
Hospitals in Cameroon
Hospitals established in 1965
1965 establishments in Cameroon